Kyle Staver is an artist who lives in New York City.

Biography
Originally from Minnesota, Kyle Staver settled in New York following graduate studies at Yale University. She has been the recent recipient of a John Simon Guggenheim Memorial Foundation Fellowship (2015) and the American Academy of Arts and Letters Purchase Prize (2015). Staver was also recognized as a distinguished member of the National Academy of New York. Her work has been exhibited in Pennsylvania College of Art & Design, the American Academy of Arts & Letters, the National Academy, Fordham University, and Haverford College. Staver received her BFA from Minneapolis College of Art and Design and a decade later she received her MFA in Painting from Yale University's College of Art.

Selected exhibitions
 2016 On Painting, Kent Fine Art, New York, NY
 2015 Steven Harvey Fine Art Projects, New York NY
 2015 Worlds Without End, Brian Morris Gallery and Buddy Warren Inc., New York NY
 2015 B Side, No. 4 Studio, Brooklyn NY
 2015 Invitational Exhibition of Visual Arts, American Academy of Arts and Letters, New York NY
 2014 Soul, Novella Gallery, New York NY
 2014 Mixtape, NO.4 Studio, New York NY
 2013 Tibor de Nagy, New York NY
 2013 John Davis Gallery, Hudson NY
 2013 John Davis Gallery, Hudson NY
 2013 Silence & Noise, Whispers, Hints, Narrative and Declarations, The Next Gallery, Metropolitan College of New York, New York NY
 2011 Pennsylvania College of Art & Design, Lancaster PA
 2010 Lohin-Geduld Gallery, New York NY
 2003 Denise Bibro Gallery, New York NY
 2002 Maurice Arlos Fine Arts, New York NY
 2001 Hackett-Freedman Gallery, San Francisco CA

Selected bibliography
 Barry, Mark. “Myth and Magic on the Hudson.” IonArts 2 June 2013. Web.
 Belz, Carl. “Wherefore the Figure, Wherefore the Self.” Left Bank Art Blog 17 May 2012. Web.
 Butler, Sharon. “In Her Own Words: Kyle Staver.” Two Coats of Paint 26 Jan. 2013
 Doubrovskaia, Maria. “Kyle Staver on Myth, Irony and Being a Painter.” Project Inkblot 2013. Web.
 Ebony, David. “Top 10 New York Gallery Shows This Fall,” Artnet News 22 Sept. 2015.
 Einspruch, Franklin. “Hail the High Priestess: Kyle Staver and the Cult of Painting,” Artcritical 28 Sept. 2015.
 Einspruch, Franklin. “Surety and Uncertainty.” The New York Sun 5 Feb. 2013.
 Goodrich, John. “Kyle Staver: Paintings, Prints, Reliefs.” OnViewAt.com 18 Feb. 2013. Web.
 Goodrich, John. “Cozy, Playful and Disciplined.” The New York Sun 12 Jan. 2006.
 Haider, Faheem. “Kyle Staver: Painting in Relief.” Anartism 18 Feb. 2014. Web.
 Johnson, Ken. “The Listings: Kyle Staver.” New York Times 20 Jan 2006.
 Kaczmarczyk, Jeffrey. “Art Prize 2013.” MLive.com 23 Sept. 2013. Web.
 Keeting, Zachary. “Kyle Staver.” Gorky's Granddaughter 9 Dec. 2011. Web.
 Kohler, William Echkardt. “Painting Lives! ‘Mark, Wipes, Scrape, Shape’ at Spaceshifter.” Huffington Post 29 Nov. 2012.
 “Kyle Staver.” ArtPneuma 22 Feb. 2012. Web video.
 Maidman, Daniel. “Theophany: Kyle Staver’s Greek Myth Paintings at Tibor de Nagy Gallery.” Huffington Post 16 Oct. 2013.
 Miller, Chris. “Push Pull Riverside Arts Center.” New City Art 19 June 2012. Web.
 Naves, Mario. “Unabashedly Under the Influence: Powerful Tributes to Precedent.” New York Observer 30 Jan. 2006. 
 Naves, Mario. “A Sensation (Minus the Buzz): The Intimate, Acutely Observed.” New York Observer 27 Oct. 2003
 Radell, Thaddeus. “Kyle Staver: Theater of the Odd,” Painting Perceptions 21 Nov. 2013.
 Samet, Jennifer. “Kyle Staver.” Beer with a Painter 9 Feb. 2013. Web.
 Seed, John. “Into the Mythological Zone.” Huffington Post 2 Feb. 2013.
 Seed, John. “A Brother Honored.” Huffington Post 13 Dec. 2011.
 Smith, Roberta. “The Listings: Kyle Staver Recent Works.” New York Times 18 March 2010.
 Smith, Roberta. “A Profusion of Painting, Very Much Alive.” New York Times 10 May 2002.
 The Labletter, 13th Edition 2011.
 Wilkin, Karen. The Hudson Review 2014.
 Wilkin, Karen. “At the Galleries.” The Hudson Review Vol. LXI, No. 1, Spring 2008.
 Yau, John. “Paradise Regained, If Only for the Night,” Hyperallergic 13 Sept. 2015.
 Yau, John. “How to Kiss the Sky: Kyle Staver’s Recent Paintings.” Hyperallergic 27 Oct. 2013.

References

American artists
Artists from Minnesota
Living people
Year of birth missing (living people)